André Filipe Alves Monteiro (born 16 March 1988), known as Ukra, is a Portuguese professional footballer who plays for Rio Ave F.C. mainly as a right winger.

Formed at Porto, where he made eight senior appearances, he played over 200 Primeira Liga games for five clubs, mainly in two spells at Rio Ave and also Olhanense, Braga and Santa Clara.

Ukra earned 46 caps for Portugal at youth level, and played one senior match in 2015.

Club career

Porto
Born in Vila Nova de Famalicão, Braga District, Ukra began playing football for F.C. Famalicão, moving at age 13 to FC Porto to complete his formation. In 2007–08 he got his first taste of first-team football, spending one season on loan to another northern club, Varzim S.C. in the Segunda Liga.

In the following two years, Ukra continued on loan, now in the south of the country with S.C. Olhanense. He scored six goals in 30 matches in his debut campaign, helping the Algarve team to return to the Primeira Liga after 34 years. In November 2009, it was reported that the player was being scouted by Newcastle United of the Football League Championship after an under-21 match against England at Wembley in which he played the full 90 minutes.

In January 2011, Ukra was loaned to S.C. Braga, contributing solidly as the Minho side finished fourth and qualified for the UEFA Europa League by netting twice, notably in a 3–1 home win against Vitória de Guimarães in a local derby. He did not participate in the club's Europa League runner-up campaign, being cup-tied after having appeared in the competition for eventual champions Porto; he made his debut for them on 19 August 2010 by starting in the 3–0 win at K.R.C. Genk in the first leg of the playoff, and came off the bench in a 3–1 win at SK Rapid Wien in the group stage.

Ukra was again loaned to Braga for 2011–12, spending however the better part of the season on the sidelines due to injury a left knee tendon injury picked up in a friendly against C.D. Aves in July. He returned on 4 February 2012 in a Taça da Liga group game against Portimonense SC, and 23 days later again as a late replacement, he scored to conclude a 4–0 home win over local rivals Vitória SC. On 22 March, he was one of two Arsenalistas to miss in the penalty shootout defeat to Gil Vicente F.C. in the league cup semi-finals.

Rio Ave
Ukra spent four years with fellow top-division team Rio Ave FC, the first on loan in 2012–13. He scored his first goal for the club on 2 February 2013 to help the hosts defeat Sporting CP 2–1, and also netted twice during the team's runner-up run in the 2013–14 edition of the Taça de Portugal.

Abroad
On 18 July 2016, free agent Ukra signed with Al-Fateh SC from the Saudi Professional League. In February 2018, in the same capacity, he joined Bulgaria's PFC CSKA Sofia. He made his first (and only) official appearance for the latter on 31 March, in the 4–1 home victory over PFC Botev Plovdiv in a league match, coming on as a substitute during the second half; in June, he was released.

Return to Portugal
Ukra returned to Portugal's top flight on 8 August 2018, signing with newly promoted C.D. Santa Clara. After making 23 appearances in his first season in the Azores, he was given a two-year contract extension. He missed only seven games in his final season as the team came a best-ever sixth and qualified for the UEFA Europa Conference League; his one goal that campaign was a penalty in the sixth minute of added time to conclude a 5–1 rout of C.D. Nacional at the Estádio de São Miguel on 11 April 2021.

On 12 July 2021, the 33-year-old Ukra returned to Rio Ave on a one-year deal. After helping to promotion as champions, he was retained in the top flight by manager Luís Freire.

International career
In mid-2009, courtesy of his solid Olhanense displays, Ukra was summoned for the Portugal under-21s. He represented the nation at the 2007 UEFA European Under-19 Championship, and also took part in the unsuccessful qualifying campaign for the 2007 European Under-21 Championship.

Ukra made his debut for the full side on 31 March 2015, coming on as a 46th-minute substitute for João Mário in a 0–2 friendly defeat against Cape Verde in Estoril.

Personal life
Ukra's nickname derives from his youth, when his thin-blond hair led to him being called "Ukrainian" ("Ucraniano" in Portuguese), which was then shortened to "Ukra".

Club statistics

Honours
Porto
Primeira Liga: 2010–11
Taça de Portugal: 2010–11
Supertaça Cândido de Oliveira: 2010
UEFA Europa League: 2010–11

Olhanense
Segunda Liga: 2008–09

Rio Ave
Liga Portugal 2: 2021–22

References

External links

1988 births
Living people
People from Vila Nova de Famalicão
Sportspeople from Braga District
Portuguese footballers
Association football forwards
Primeira Liga players
Liga Portugal 2 players
FC Porto players
Padroense F.C. players
Varzim S.C. players
S.C. Olhanense players
S.C. Braga players
Rio Ave F.C. players
C.D. Santa Clara players
Saudi Professional League players
Al-Fateh SC players
First Professional Football League (Bulgaria) players
PFC CSKA Sofia players
Portugal youth international footballers
Portugal under-21 international footballers
Portugal international footballers
Portuguese expatriate footballers
Expatriate footballers in Saudi Arabia
Expatriate footballers in Bulgaria
Portuguese expatriate sportspeople in Saudi Arabia
Portuguese expatriate sportspeople in Bulgaria